The Cheshire Lines Committee (CLC) was formed in the 1860s and became the second-largest joint railway in Great Britain. The committee, which was often styled the Cheshire Lines Railway, operated  of track in the then counties of Lancashire and Cheshire. The railway did not get grouped into one of  the Big Four during the implementation of the 1923 grouping, surviving independently with its own management until the railways were nationalised at the beginning of 1948. The railway  served Liverpool, Manchester, Stockport, Warrington, Widnes, Northwich, Winsford, Knutsford, Chester and Southport with connections to many other railways.

Formation
The Cheshire Lines Committee evolved in the late 1850s from the close working together of two railways, the Manchester, Sheffield and Lincolnshire Railway (MS&LR) and the Great Northern Railway (GNR); this was in their desire to break the near monopoly on rail traffic held by the London and North Western Railway (LNWR) in the Southern Lancashire and Northern Cheshire areas. The CLC operated in an area which included the rapidly growing major cities of Manchester and Liverpool, the developing Lancashire coal fields and the growth of the Mersey's seaborne trade.

In 1857, the GNR and MS&LR arranged to work closer together. The MS&LR had just come out of an unhappy alliance with the LNWR and the GNR was motivated by the opportunity to gain access to Manchester, via the MS&LR route from Retford. A joint MS&LR/GNR service between Manchester London Road and London Kings Cross was provided and the arrangements were formalised by Parliament.

Relations between the LNWR and MS&LR companies were never strong, but they deteriorated in 1859 when the MS&LR supported several new railways in the Manchester area; two of which, the Cheshire Midland (incorporated 14 June 1860) and the Stockport & Woodley Junction (incorporated 15 May 1860) were to form part of the initial CLC.

In 1860, the MS&LR was interested in three additional bills that would extend its influence towards Liverpool and Chester; they were the Garston & Liverpool (incorporated 17 May 1861), the Stockport, Timperley & Altrincham Junction (incorporated 17 May 1861) and the West Cheshire (incorporated 11 July 1861). Unfortunately, the MS&LR was unable to fund the building of these railways by itself.

The shortage of funds led to a variety of negotiations, including the potential of a merger with the GNR, but eventually an agreement was reached on 11 June 1862 between the MS&LR and the GNR. The arrangement was for the establishment of a joint committee to regulate and work traffic on four of the railways already authorised but not yet open. The lines were:
Stockport and Woodley Junction Railway opened 12 January 1863.
Cheshire Midland Railway opened in two stages in May 1862 and January 1863.
Stockport, Timperley and Altrincham Junction Railway opened in December 1865.
West Cheshire Railway opened on 1 September 1869.

Each company was to provide an equal amount of capital and four representatives to the joint management committee. This arrangement was confirmed by the Great Northern (Cheshire Lines) Act in Parliament in 1863; this was the first official use of Cheshire Lines and at the time it was entirely appropriate as the majority of the lines involved were in Cheshire. This Act had not, however, formally set up a separate legal body, providing instead for the two companies to manage and work the four railways through their existing structures.

This terminus station was only in use from 1864 to 1874, when it was superseded by Liverpool Central,  but it did have an extended life as a goods station. The Act included a short line to connect a goods station, Wavertree Road (later Wavertree and Edge Hill), to the LNWR at Edge Hill and running powers from there to Garston.

Included within this Act were running powers between Garston Dock and Timperley Junction using the lines of the LNWR through Widnes, Warrington and Lymm.  and then the Manchester, South Junction and Altrincham Railway (MSJ&AR) through to Manchester. The jointly administered lines at this time were known as The Liverpool, Garston & Cheshire Railways.

Liverpool Brunswick station was inconveniently situated near the Southern docks, a good distance from the city centre. This necessitated the railway to transport passengers and their goods by omnibus into the city centre. To rectify this, the partners applied to build an extension railway and this resulted in the building of a difficult line, mainly in tunnels, to a new .

The Midland Railway (MR) secured a route into Manchester city centre in 1862 and they began to look at options to secure traffic to the west of Manchester and particularly into Liverpool. This led to their associating with the MS&LR and GNR and their partnership working of the lines mentioned above.

These lines were brought together under the direct joint ownership of the MS&LR and GNR in 1865 by the Cheshire Lines Transfer Act. They were:
Stockport and Woodley Junction Railway;
Cheshire Midland Railway;
Stockport, Timperley and Altrincham Junction Railway;
West Cheshire Railway;
Garston and Liverpool Railway; and
The Liverpool Central Station Railway.
The Act additionally gave powers for the MR to join as an equal partner, which it did in 1866.

The MS&LR's  and  Branch Railway was transferred to the CLC in 1866. This left a small section of track between Apethorne Junction and Woodley Junction that still belonged to the Sheffield and Midland Joint Railway, with the CLC having running powers.

The Cheshire Lines Committee was finally authorised, by The Cheshire Lines Act in 1867, as a fully independent organisation with a board formed from three directors from each of the parent companies.

Manchester to Liverpool
In 1864, Mr Edward Watkin, the MS&LR's chairman, proposed a more direct railway from Manchester to connect with the Garston and Liverpool Railway; this was mainly on the grounds that the existing arrangements for running powers on LNWR lines were inadequate. He had a point, as the lines were being used by three companies and had several curves that needed careful, and therefore slow, negotiation; there were 95 level-crossings and 60 or more signals in each direction.

This proposal was made in the name of the MS&LR only, but Mr Watkin solicited support from the other CLC partners as it was in their interest, because of a competing potential alliance between the Lancashire and Yorkshire Railway (L&YR) and the Great Eastern Railway (GER). This proposal led to the MS&LR (Extension to Liverpool) Act of 1865; this Act was subsequently amended by the MS&LR (New Lines) Act of 1866 which altered the route slightly.

The result was two lines:
one from Cornbrook, near Old Trafford in Manchester, where a connection was made with the MSJ&AR to a junction with CLC (former Garston and Liverpool Railway) line near Cressington;
the second from a junction with the first line at Glazebrook to a new junction, Skelton junction, with the CLC (former Stockport, Timperley & Altrincham Junction Railway) near Timperley.

The other alteration to the route, promulgated under the 1866 Act, was as the result of Warrington residents agitating to have the railway come closer to the town centre. The loop and station opened in 1873; the direct route, otherwise known as the Warrington avoiding line, was not opened until 1883. In 1897 an impressive two-storey brick goods warehouse was built in the goods yard, superseding an earlier smaller structure.

A further MS&LR Act, the MS&LR (Liverpool Extension) Act of 1866, then formally transferred these lines into the CLC.

The route was further improved when Liverpool Central station opened on 1 March 1874, bringing trains into the city centre. The station was situated on Ranelagh Street on the edge of the city centre and was a much grander station of three stories with a large arched roof and six platform faces. At the same time as Central opened, Brunswick closed to passenger traffic; it became a goods station and a much larger warehouse was built around the original station building.

The line was jointly owned by the MS&LR and the MR; the CLC ran a passenger service on the line. The loop line closed in 1964.

The building of the Manchester Ship Canal resulted in two diversions of the line in order to cross the canal at a high level on fixed bridges. The first was at Irlam where a diversion was constructed to the south of the original line and a new  was constructed, both the old route and the diversion were operational from 9 January 1893 to 27 March 1893 when the original route closed. Both routes were operational from 27 February 1893 to 29 May 1893 when the original route closed.

Extension to Chester
The Chester and West Cheshire Junction Railway Company had been incorporated in 1865 to construct railways from Mouldsworth
to Mickle Trafford and onto , with a junction at Mickle Trafford connecting to the Birkenhead Railway.

This was a natural extension of the CLC network and indeed authorised, albeit by a different company, what the West Cheshire Railway had applied, and failed, to do in 1861. It brought access to the county town of Chester, an important tourist centre and gateway to North Wales to the expanding network. The Chester and West Cheshire Junction Railway Company was transferred into the CLC on 10 August 1866.

Construction work did not start straight away, being delayed by contractual negotiations until 1871. The railways, but not the junction with the Birkenhead Railway, opened for goods traffic on 2 November 1874 and for passengers on 1 May 1875. The junction at Mickle Trafford was made in 1875 to enable traffic between the CLC and  but it was not used due to a dispute.

Improvements in Manchester
The direct route to Liverpool, and into Liverpool Central station from 1874, allowed an increased density of service with sixteen trains in each direction. These trains left Manchester London Road using the Manchester, South Junction and Altrincham Railway (MSJ&AR) as far as Cornbrook, then crossing onto the CLC direct line. It was recognised early on that the additional services were going to cause congestion at the Manchester end of the line; at this time, London Road station had been expanded and effectively divided into several stations. The main station was split in half: one half for the LNWR and the other for the MS&LR, which it shared with the Midland Railway. The third section of the station was the MSJ&AR platform area, adjacent to the main station; these platforms were used as the terminus for passenger services, but the lines also provided a through connection for freight from Lancashire to Yorkshire.

This brought the CLC right into Manchester city centre and a temporary station, Manchester Free Trade Hall station, was opened on 9 July 1877. This station was a modest affair, with two platforms and two intermediate tracks, but it enabled the CLC to introduce an improved hourly express service to Liverpool taking 45 minutes which attracted passengers.

Even before the temporary Free Trade Hall station opened, the CLC had been authorised to build a permanent station in 1875; this station,  which was opened on 1 July 1880, was immediately adjacent to Free Trade Hall station with its frontage on Windmill Street. This station had two storeys, goods below and passengers above; it had eight platforms, later increased to nine, six of which were covered by an impressive  single span roof, the other two were protected by an awning on the side of the shed. Most of the station facilities, including the booking office and waiting rooms, were of wooden construction, being intended for temporary use but they lasted until the station's eventual closure in 1969.

When Central opened in 1880, the Free Trade Hall station closed to passengers and was converted to a goods station; it had another warehouse added in 1882.

The Great Northern Railway (GNR) opened a goods warehouse adjacent to the former Free Trade Hall station, between it and Deansgate; the warehouse and its connecting line opened in 1898. The GNR worked goods trains into it from Colwick, using running powers over the Midland from Codnor Park Junction.

Midlands connection
The Manchester South District Railway (MSDR) was originally promoted by a group of local landowners, supported by the Midland Railway (MR), to provide a local railway between Manchester and Alderley. It was incorporated in 1873, but nothing done by 1875 when the MR proposed that the section north of Stockport should become part of the CLC, thereby providing MR with access to Central.

At about the same time, in 1875, the construction of Manchester Free Trade Hall station was taking place; the authorisation for the permanent Manchester Central station had been obtained and the MS&LR gave notice to the Midland to quit using Manchester London Road station within three years because of the congestion, as the Midland was a partner in the CLC it was natural for them to try to gain access to the new Central.

In 1876, with nothing much happening on the MSDR and the Midland Railway becoming increasing anxious to find station facilities in Manchester, the Midland proposed that the MSDR became a joint railway to be known as the Sheffield and Midland Railway Companies Committee (MS&LR & MR). A condition of the joint railway was equal funding of the capital to build the line; the MS&LR was not forthcoming with their share and the Midland then petitioned for the undertaking to be transferred to its sole ownership, which was accepted. The Act also provided powers for the GNR to share in the enterprise, in which case the line would have transferred to the CLC; this option was not exercised, so it remained a Midland Railway line. The line from Heaton Mersey Junction to Throstle Nest Junction (later Throstle Nest East Junction), on the CLC near Cornbrook,  opened on 1 January 1880. On 1 August 1880, MR switched its services from London Road to Manchester Central. When the MR was established at Central, they had 26 departures: the 14 South District local trains; and 12 trains for Derby, Nottingham, Leicester and London.

In 1891, the section from Throstle Nest Junction to Chorlton Junction (the junction with the MS&LR line to Fairfield on the London Road to Guide Bridge route) was transferred to the CLC.

Expansion on Merseyside
Completion of the direct Manchester to Liverpool line, and the connections to it from Timperley and on to the Midland Railway, provided the partners with access to Liverpool without going through Manchester. The only connection the CLC had with the dock complex on the Mersey was at Brunswick, at the very southern end of the docks. Despite improvements made during the 1870s and 1880s and connections with adjacent docks from 1884, the CLC was not able to compete with other railways in the area for the large freight market. Both the LNWR and the L&YR had better connections to the docks, both in terms of quantity and the quality of which docks they connected to.

To improve this situation, the CLC acquired  of land at Huskisson in north Liverpool. To access this site, several lines were authorised by the Cheshire Lines Act. In 1874, these lines, known locally as the North Liverpool Extension Line, were:
 Halewood to Aintree: facilitated by a north bound triangular junction from the Liverpool Extension Railway between Halewood and Hunts Cross stations to a junction with the East Lancashire section of the L&YR at Aintree. The inside of these junctions provided space for an extensive array of goods sidings.
 Fazakerley to Walton-on-the-Hill and Huskisson: facilitated by a westbound triangular junction from the Halewood to Aintree line above. The inside of these junctions also provided space for another extensive array of goods sidings.
The section to Huskisson and  station, for both passenger and goods trains, opened on 1 June 1880. A passenger service was provided from Liverpool Central to Walton-on-the-Hill, but it proved unpopular and thereafter most services terminated at Gateacre. When Huskisson opened, it too was provided with a passenger service that was even less popular: it was withdrawn on 1 May 1885 and the station closed. The line became known as the Liverpool Loop Line.

Huskisson goods facility became a large complex of warehouses and sidings, including cranes, stablings, cattle pens for up to 2,000 cattle, cotton and grain stores, offices and a turntable. There was a timber yard in Victoria Road and a lairage for a further 1,200 cattle in Foster Street, to cope with the cattle traffic from Ireland; much of which was on its way to Stanley cattle market near Knotty Ash station. A short connection was made from Huskisson to Victoria Yard Goods (owned by the Mersey Docks and Harbour Board) and Sandon and Canada Goods railway station (owned by the Midland Railway) in 1882.
  
The junction with the L&YR was to the north of a further station,  which opened on 13 July 1880 (becoming Aintree on 1884). This connection at Aintree provided an additional route onto the CLC for Midland Railway traffic, which had access from the north via Colne and Preston.

The Midland Railway made a connection at Fazakerley to its Langton Dock Branch and goods station in 1885.

The CLC established goods depots over the Mersey in Birkenhead; they opened  depot on 1 July 1871 to the south of the docks and the East & West Float depot at Duke Street in November 1892 to the north. Neither depot was connected to CLC lines, but were accessed from Helsby over the Birkenhead Railway.

The railway did not connect to the CLC lines, but ran to an underground station accessed via steps from the upper station concourse.

Southport and Cheshire Lines Extension Railway

The line was independent but was operated by the CLC.

Management
CLC chief offices were originally at 45 Oldhall Street, Liverpool but were transferred in June 1865 to Alexandra Buildings, 19 James Street, Liverpool. They moved to Liverpool Central station when it opened in 1874.

In 1863, the CLC management committee was made up of four representatives each from its founding companies, which were the Manchester, Sheffield and Lincolnshire Railway (MS&LR) and the Great Northern Railway (GNR). The management committee (still at this time just MS&LR and GNR) became direct owners and operators of railways in 1865, by the Cheshire Lines Transfer Act. The Transfer Act allowed for the Midland Railway (MR) to become equal partners in the committee and they took up these powers in 1866; the Cheshire Lines Committee was now finally authorised as a fully independent organisation by The Cheshire Lines Act in 1867. Now that the CLC had three parent companies, the management was divided by three with each partner having three places.

The committee first met at Manchester on 5 November 1863, where William English was appointed manager; his tenure lasted until 1882. He was succeeded on 1 October 1882 by David Meldrum, who unfortunately died in office in January 1904. In the interim, the committee was managed by Harry Blundell, the Engineer-in-Chief, and Robert Charlton, the Outdoor Superintendent. James Pinion took over in May 1904 and remained manager until 1910, although with reduced responsibilities in his last year before retirement. There followed another interim period, with Charlton and Blundell and the Indoor Assistant, William Oates, running the committee until a new manager, John Edward Charnley, was appointed in August 1911. He had the difficult job of managing the committee through World War I and the 1923 grouping where most railways were grouped into one of  the Big Four.

Charnley was the manager from 1911 to 1922 when he became secretary and manager for three years until he was succeeded, on his death, by his assistant, William Howard Oates in February 1925. Oates also died in office after only a year and was followed by Alfred Percy Ross, who combined the manager's role with that of Chief Engineer for a few years until July 1929. Sidney Burgoyne followed as manager in that December; he had come from the LNER and he returned there in 1932. The committee's last manager also came from the LNER; Gerald Leedham was designated Acting Manager from January 1933 until 1936, when he became Secretary and Manager until the committee was nationalised at the end of 1947.

Grouping

The Railways Act of 1921 grouped most of Britain's railways into one of the Big Four; however, a number of joint lines remained outside the Big Four and continued to be operated jointly by the successor companies. These included the Cheshire Lines Committee and it remained independent with its own management. Its management was still made up of nine directors, three from each parent company, and these companies had been grouped. The Midland was grouped into the London, Midland and Scottish Railway (LMS), while the GNR and MS&LR (by then the Great Central Railway) became part of the London and North Eastern Railway (LNER). This meant the CLC now had six directors from the LNER and three from the LMS.

The CLC continued under this management arrangement until the railways were nationalised under the Transport Act of 1947 at the beginning of 1948.

Stock
Although, in all other respects, the CLC was a complete railway, it did not own any locomotives. Its motive power was provided by the parent companies which, in practice, was the MS&LR, as it had a comparatively close locomotive works at Gorton in east Manchester. The MS&LR charged the CLC a mileage charge for each locomotive hire, depending on whether it was being used for passenger trains or freight. The directors of the other companies argued from the beginning that the CLC should have its own locomotives, as the hire charge was too high; this led to a reduction in the charge but not by enough to satisfy the GNR and MR directors. Eventually, the issue went to arbitration. Arbitration concluded that there was no viable alternative and the MS&LR (later the GCR/LNER) would provide locomotives for CLC needs, albeit at a slightly reduced rate. The other companies would provide their own locomotives for their own through trains.

On the other hand, facilities for locomotives, the engine sheds, were provided by the CLC. Some of these provided facilities for all of the partners, others just for the MS&LR. They were:

The CLC's only contribution to motive power was the introduction of four Sentinel-Cammell steam railcars that were introduced in 1929; they worked all over the network until were withdrawn in 1941 and scrapped in 1944.

At the company's formation, a small number of coaches were provided by the MS&LR and MR jointly. However, an early management meeting recommended that the company have its own carriage stock and, from 1865, four-wheeled carriages were obtained from the Metropolitan Railway Carriage and Wagon Company Ltd and the Railway Carriage Co. of Oldbury. As new lines opened, more carriages were acquired from the same places, the MS&LR and the Ashbury Railway Carriage & Iron Co.

Six-wheeled carriages were introduced when Manchester Central station opened in 1880 and the company then started to use bogie coaches; some of these lasting into the 1930s. Twelve-wheel bogie coaches were introduced from 1881 and were still being made in 1900; all of these coaches had varying mixtures of first, second and third class up until 1892, when second-class was abolished. Coaches were fitted with vacuum braking from about 1887 and some attempts were made with electric lighting about the same time; electric lighting did not become generally adopted until after 1900, the 1890s had to manage with oil gas.

The CLC had a total of 407 coaches in 1902 and 580 in 1923. New articulated stock was introduced in 1937, designed by Nigel Gresley and with a teak finish, for the Liverpool to Manchester service; they were in two trains each of four twins. The number of coaches seems to have been rationalised by 1938, with only a total of 284 coaches.

Legacy
The CLC routes between Liverpool and Manchester and between Manchester and Chester via Northwich survive. The CLC warehouse at Warrington is also a listed building, and has been converted to apartments.

Liverpool Central high-level has been demolished with local services on the former CLC line, operated by Merseyrail, running through an underground station on the same site. Main line services run to and from Liverpool Lime Street. Manchester Central closed on 4 May 1969 and is now the Manchester Central Convention Complex.

References

Notes

Acts of Parliament

Citations

Bibliography

External links
Article written as at 1935; part CLC
North Liverpool Extension Line
CLC Liverpool area
CLC Pages at the LNER Encyclopedia

Railway companies established in 1862
British joint railway companies
Rail transport in Cheshire
Rail transport in Lancashire
Rail transport in Greater Manchester
British companies established in 1862